A number of units of measurement were used in Morocco to measure length, mass, capacity, etc.  Metric system has been compulsory in Morocco since 1923.

System before metric system

A number of local units were used.

Length

Several units were used.  These units were variable, not rigidly defined.  Some units included:

1 cubit = 0.533 m

1 canna = 0.533 m

1 pic = 0.61 m

1 tonni =  pic.

The code, covid, covado, cadee, or dhra was varied from 19.85 to 22.48 in (perhaps the best value was 20.92 in (0.531 3 m).

Mass

Several units were used. These units were variable, not rigidly defined.  Some units included:

1  = 507.5 g

1  = 507.5 g

1  = 3 kg

1  = 22 rotal

1  = 100 rotal.
One rotl of commerce was equal to 1.19 lb while one rotl of the markets was equal to 1.7 lbs.

Capacity

Several units were used. These units were variable, not rigidly defined.  Some units included:

1  = 56 L

1  = 56 L

1 mudd = 14 L

1  = 14 L.

References

Moroccan culture
Morocco